Helsingborg exhibition of 1955, also known as H55, was a BIE recognised world's fair held in Helsingborg, Sweden held between 10 June and 28 August 1955.  

A total of nine nations were represented at the exhibition: Denmark, Finland, France, Japan, Norway, Sweden, Switzerland, United Kingdom, and West Germany.

Its theme was arts and crafts, with an aim of showing how modern design could be used in commercial as well as luxury goods. Exhibitors came from 10 countries with items including Nisse Strinning's String design bookshelf

Still standing in Helsingborg from the exhibition are the Concert Hall, Parapet Restaurant, and Bar 55.

References

External links
Exposition Helsingborg (French)

1955 in Sweden
Helsingborg
World's fairs in Sweden
20th century in Skåne County